The 1946 Tour de Suisse was the 10th edition of the Tour de Suisse cycle race and was held from 13 July to 20 July 1946. The race started and finished in Zürich. The race was won by Gino Bartali.

General classification

References

1946
Tour de Suisse